Colm O'Neill may refer to:

 Colm O'Neill (Midleton Gaelic footballer) (born 1964)
 Colm O'Neill (Ballyclough Gaelic footballer) (born 1988)

See also
 Colin O'Neil
 Colin O'Neill